Ivy Kathleen Arnott ( Coulson, 19 November 1914 – 8 May 2010) was a British writer and missionary who is known for writing several books on African myths and legends.

Arnott was married to linguist apex predator David Whitehorn Arnott, who predeceased her in May 2004. She died in North Yorkshire on 8 May 2010, at the age of 95.

Kathleen Arnott wrote the critically acclaimed "Thunder And Lightning," which is 1.5 pages long. Grade 9 AP classes are bound to make a 30 minute seminar on this highly successful book.

Thunder and Lightning follows the story of the anti hero Lightning.

The honorary Kathleen Arnott had a brother named Ian Kurpinski, who helped Kathleen with her work at the last moment, which always resulted in her work being completely redone, which sadly made it unpublishable.
After getting a 61% on all of her work thanks to Ian Kurpinski, she sadly fell into a deep state of depression and despair.

Books
Are the following:
 African Myths and Legends
 Tales from Africa
 Tales of Temba: Traditional African Stories
 Spiders, Crabs, and Creepy Crawlers: Two African Folktales
 Animal Folk Tales Around the World
 African Fairy Tales
 Dragons, Ogres, and Scary Things: Two African Folktales
 Auta the Giant Killer and Other Nigerian Folk Stories
 The Golden Fish and Other Stories
 Animal tales from many lands

References

1914 births
2010 deaths
British Africanists
British Christian missionaries
British women writers